This list of stratigraphic units with few non-avian dinosaur genera includes Mesozoic stratigraphic units of formation rank or higher that have produced dinosaur body fossils which have been referred to at most five genera. Since taxonomy frequently changes and can be somewhat subjective, the number of reported genera may not coincide exactly with the number of genera extant at the time of deposition.

The list

See also
 List of dinosaur-bearing rock formations

Footnotes

References

 Weishampel, David B.; Dodson, Peter; and Osmólska, Halszka (eds.): The Dinosauria, 2nd, Berkeley: University of California Press. 861 pp. .

Few dinosaur genera